Evil Roy Slade is a 1972 American made-for-television Western comedy film about the  "meanest villain in the West". It was directed by Jerry Paris and co-produced and co-written by Garry Marshall. The film is considered a cult classic.

Plot
Orphaned and left in the desert as an infant, Evil Roy Slade (John Astin) grew up raised by buzzards—save for his teddy bear—and mean. As an adult, he is notorious for being the "meanest villain in the West", so he is thrown for quite a loop when he falls for sweet schoolmarm Betsy Potter (Pamela Austin). Nelson L. Stool (Mickey Rooney), a railroad tycoon, along with his dimwitted nephew Clifford (Henry Gibson), attempts to get revenge on Evil Roy Slade for repeatedly robbing him, and sets out to hire legendary retired singing-sheriff Marshal Bing Bell (Dick Shawn) to bring Slade to justice.

Cast
 John Astin as Evil Roy Slade
 Mickey Rooney as Nelson L. Stool
 Dick Shawn as Marshal Bing Bell
 Henry Gibson as Clifford Stool
 Dom DeLuise as Dr. Logan Delp
 Edie Adams as Flossie
 Pamela Austin as Betsy Potter
 Milton Berle as Harry Fern
 Arthur Batanides as Lee
 Larry Hankin as Snake
 Robert Liberman as Preacher
 Edmund Cambridge as Smith
 Connie Sawyer as Aggie Potter
 Alice Nunn as Claire Beckendorf
 Pat Morita as Turhan
 Luana Anders as Alice Fern
 Billy Sands as Randolph Sweet
 Milton Frome as Foss
 Pat Buttram as Narrator (voice only; uncredited)
 Penny Marshall as Bank Teller (uncredited)
 Billy Curtis as Toy Cowboy (uncredited)
 Ed Begley, Jr. (uncredited)

References

External links
 
 

1970s English-language films
1972 television films
1972 films
1970s Western (genre) comedy films
NBC network original films
Films directed by Jerry Paris
American Western (genre) comedy films
1970s American films